Trakiszki  is a village in the administrative district of Gmina Puńsk, within Sejny County, Podlaskie Voivodeship, in north-eastern Poland, close to the border with Lithuania.

Transport
Trakiszki has a railway station along the rail line connecting Poland's standard gauge network with Lithuania's Russian gauge system.

References

Trakiszki
Lithuania–Poland border crossings